CFRG was a Canadian radio station, which broadcast in Gravelbourg, Saskatchewan from 1952 to 1973. A private affiliate of Radio-Canada, the station was owned by Radio-Gravelbourg Ltée.

CFRG originally aired at 1230 AM, signing on June 1, 1952. On October 14, 1956, the station became a daytimer, moving to 710 during the day but retaining a nighttime signal on the original 1230 frequency with the call sign CFGR. The two stations broadcast with 5,000 and 250 watts, respectively.

The station and CFNS in Saskatoon were purchased by Radio-Canada in 1973 to become rebroadcasters of Regina's new CBKF-FM. The transmitter, which now has the call sign CBKF-1, is still in operation as a rebroadcaster of CBKF on 690 kHz.

The call sign was later revived on CFRG-FM, a francophone community radio station in Gravelbourg.

References

External links
 
 

FRG
FRG
FRG
Radio stations established in 1952
Radio stations disestablished in 1973
1952 establishments in Saskatchewan
1973 disestablishments in Saskatchewan
FRG
FRG (1956-73)